Arlington Plantation House (now known as Arlington Historic Home & Gardens) is an historic home located at 56 E. Main St. in Franklin, Louisiana.

Description and history 
It is a -story Greek Revival style house, designed and used as a single dwelling, and is undoubtedly the most widely recognized historic archetype of the southern states. It was added to the National Register of Historic Places on October 5, 1982.

In August 2020 it is available for rent as an event venue.

References

External links
Arlington Historic Home & Gardens, official site

Houses on the National Register of Historic Places in Louisiana
Plantation houses in Louisiana
Houses in St. Mary Parish, Louisiana
National Register of Historic Places in St. Mary Parish, Louisiana
Greek Revival houses in Louisiana